The 1983 Florida Gators football team represented the University of Florida during the 1983 NCAA Division I-A football season. The season was Charley Pell's fifth as the head coach of the Florida Gators football team.  Pell's Gators posted a 9–2–1 overall record and a Southeastern Conference (SEC) record of 4–2, placing third among ten SEC teams.  Behind a stout defense and a rushing attack led by future pros Neal Anderson, John L. Williams, and Lorenzo Hampton the 1983 Gators were the first squad in program history to be ranked among the top ten teams in the final Associated Press (AP) poll. It was also the second time that the Gators were ranked in every weekly AP Poll throughout the season, (1975 being the first).

Schedule

Primary source: 2015 Florida Gators Football Media Guide.

Roster

Rankings

Game summaries

Gator Bowl

Team players in the 1984 NFL Draft

References

Florida
Florida Gators football seasons
Gator Bowl champion seasons
Florida Gators football